Saverdun is a railway station in Saverdun, Occitanie, France. The station is on the Portet-Saint-Simon–Puigcerdà railway. The station is served by TER (local) services and Intercités de nuit night services operated by the SNCF.

Train services
The following services currently call at Saverdun:
night service (Intercités de nuit) Paris–Toulouse–Pamiers–Latour-de-Carol
local service (TER Occitanie) Toulouse–Foix–Latour-de-Carol-Enveitg

References

Railway stations in Ariège (department)
Railway stations in France opened in 1861